Flannagan mac Ceallach, Irish poet, fl. 879.

Flannagan appears to be known almost exclusively from three verses of a poem he composed upon the death of King Áed Findliath in 879. It is preserved in that year's entry in the Annals of the Four Masters:

 Long is the wintry night/with rough gusts of wind/Under pressing grief we encounter it/since the red-speared king of the noble house liveth not.
 It is awful to watch how/the waves heave from the bottom;/To them may be compared all/those who with us lament him.
 A generous, wise, staid man,/of whose renown wide-ruling Teamhair was full/A shielded oak that sheltered/the palace of Milidh's sons.
 Master of the games of the fair-hilled Tailtin/King of Teamhair of an hundred conflicts/Chief of Fodhla the noble/Aedh of Oileach who died too soon.
 Mournful, not forgotten,/the departure from this world;/Stony, not merciful/is the heart of the son of man;
 No greater than small flies/are the kings of Adam's race with him/A yew without any charge of blemish upon him/was he of the long flowing hair.

He may, or may not, be identical with a namesake King of Brega who was killed at the battle of Oldba in 895.

External links
 http://www.ucc.ie/celt/published/T100005A/

Medieval Irish poets
9th-century Irish writers
9th-century Irish poets
Irish male poets
Irish-language writers